Screen Test is a 1937 short Australian documentary directed by Charles Chauvel about how screen tests are conducted.

Brisbane girl Betty Pike features in the film and was signed to Charles Chauvel. When the film was released, Chauvel held a screen test competition to promote it.

References

External links
Screen Test at National Film and Sound Archive
Screen Test at BFI

1937 films
Documentary films about the film industry
Australian documentary films
1937 documentary films